Leighton Asia is an Asia-Pacific construction contractor, a part of the CIMIC Group, an Australian project development and contracting group. Leighton Asia is currently headquartered in Hong Kong, and has been operating in the continent for more than 45 years. Based in Hong Kong, the company also operates in Macau, Singapore, India, Indonesia, the Philippines, Thailand and Malaysia.

The company's business include building and civil infrastructure construction, Mechanical and electrical works, as well as oil and gas engineering.

History 
Leighton Asia is founded in 1975 as an Asia branch of Australian-based Leighton Contractors headquartered in Hong Kong.

Hong Kong railway project
Leighton Asia was awarded the contract for constructing the Hung Hom station extension of the Sha Tin to Central Link, a high profile railway network extension project in Hong Kong in 2013. In 2018, Leighton Asia was accused of failure to comply with local safety standards and attempting to hide this failure until a whistleblower leaked its evidence to the local press. During a hearing of the commission of inquiry, the Hong Kong Government accused Leighton of corporate arrogance.

Notable projects

Hong Kong 
 Sha Tin to Central Link's Hung Hom station Contract 1112 of MTR Corporation

Indonesia 
 New Australian Embassy Complex at Jakarta, Indonesia

Singapore 
 North South Corridor Contract N103 of Land Transport Authority (Joint Venture with Yongnam Holdings)
 Thomson–East Coast MRT line’s Springleaf MRT station Contract T208 of Land Transport Authority (Joint Venture with John Holland)

India
Antilia (building)

References

External links
Leighton Asia website

Construction and civil engineering companies of Hong Kong
Construction and civil engineering companies established in 1975
1975 establishments in Hong Kong